Iranotmethis is a genus of grasshopers in the subfamily Thrinchinae, with species found in Iran.

Species 

The following species are recognised in the genus Iranotmethis:

 Iranotmethis cyanipennis (Saussure, 1884)
 Iranotmethis luteipes Bey-Bienko, 1951
 Iranotmethis persa (Saussure, 1888)

References 

Pamphagidae